Elizabeth Madge Taylor (née Forbes; 27 December 1916 – 29 August 2002) was a New Zealand track and field athlete who competed at the 1938 British Empire Games, where she won the bronze medal in the women's high jump.

Early life and family
Born on 27 December 1916, Forbes was the daughter of Alexander Forbes and Elizabeth Herries Forbes (née McKenzie). She was educated at Waitaki Girls' High School in Oamaru.

Athletics

Forbes went on to win the New Zealand national high jump title in 1939, 1940 and 1941.

Later life and death
Forbes married George Taylor. She died on 29 August 2002.

References

1916 births
2002 deaths
Sportspeople from Oamaru
People educated at Waitaki Girls' High School
Athletes (track and field) at the 1938 British Empire Games
Commonwealth Games bronze medallists for New Zealand
Commonwealth Games medallists in athletics
New Zealand female high jumpers
Medallists at the 1938 British Empire Games